The Minister of Statistics Iceland was the head of Statistics Iceland from 1 January 1970, when the Cabinet of Iceland Act no. 73/1969 took effect, to 1 January 2008, when Statistics Iceland became an independent government agency.

List of ministers

References

External links 

 Official website 
 Official website 

 Statistics